Vladislav Yevgenevich Boiko (born 15 December 1995) is a Russian professional ice hockey forward who currently plays for HC Shakhtyor Soligorsk in the Belarusian Extraleague.

Boiko previously played one season for HC Dynamo Pardubice of the Czech Extraliga during the 2017–18 season, playing 41 games and scoring two goals and three assists. He also played one game in the Kontinental Hockey League for Admiral Vladivostok during the 2018–19 season.

References

External links

1995 births
Living people
Admiral Vladivostok players
HK Dukla Michalovce players
HC Dynamo Pardubice players
Krasnaya Armiya (MHL) players
Russian ice hockey forwards
HC Shakhtyor Soligorsk players
Ice hockey people from Moscow
Yermak Angarsk players
Russian expatriate sportspeople in the Czech Republic
Russian expatriate sportspeople in Slovakia
Russian expatriate sportspeople in Belarus
Russian expatriate sportspeople in Ukraine
Russian expatriate ice hockey people
Expatriate ice hockey players in Slovakia
Expatriate ice hockey players in the Czech Republic
Expatriate ice hockey players in Belarus
Expatriate ice hockey players in Ukraine